is a theatrical film developing and print production company established in 1955 and headquartered in Chōfu, Tokyo, Japan. In addition, the company also processes visual effects and other special effects, conversion from one film or video format to another, subtitling and other titling (such as opening and closing credits), telecine conversion, video editing, VHS duplication, and DVD production.

In addition, Tokyo Laboratory has processed many films from Taiwan and Mainland China throughout its history. Such films include Red Sorghum (film), Farewell My Concubine (film), In the Heat of the Sun etc.

Clients
Tokyo Laboratory has worked for a variety of clients, including the following:
Hankyū Tōhō Group and its successor, the Hankyu Hanshin Toho Group
Shin-Ei Animation
Tokyo Metropolitan Nishi High School

Projects
Tokyo Laboratory has worked on a variety of 166 projects, including the following:
 King Kong vs. Godzilla (1962)
 Matango (1963)
 Ultraman (1966–1967)
 Miracle Girls (1993)
 Ask Dr. Rin! (2001–2002)

rest in alphabetical order:
Ah! My Goddess: The Movie
Adventures of Pinocchio
Amada Anime Series: Super Mario Bros.
Anpanman
Akazukin Chacha
Alice SOS
Astro Boy (3rd TV series)
Ask Dr. Rin! (TV series)
Atashin'chi
Andersen Monogatari (TV series)
Anmitsu Hime (TV series)
Arabian Nights: Sinbad's Adventures
Belle et Sébastien
Castle in the Sky
Cardcaptor Sakura (TV series)
Cardcaptor Sakura: Clear Card (TV series)
Chinpui
Chouseishin Series
Clamp School Detectives (TV series)
Corrector Yui (TV series)
Crash B-Daman
Crayon Shin-chan
Cyber Team in Akihabara
Digimon Tamers
Digimon Frontier
Dokaben
Doraemon
Edonaka-machi Bugyōsho
Esper Mami
F-Zero GP Legend
Full Moon o Sagashite
Fushigi Yuugi
Ganbare, Kickers!
Gatapishi
Genji Tsūshin Agedama
Grave of the Fireflies
Gridman the Hyper Agent
Hamtaro (OVA)
High School! Kimengumi
I'm Gonna Be An Angel!
Ikkyū-san
Itsuka Giragira-suru Hi
Kochira Katsushika-ku Kameari Kōen-mae Hashutsujo
Kodocha
Lupin III (TV series 1-3)
Little Nemo: Adventures in Slumberland
Little Lulu and Her Little Friends
Lupin III: Dead or Alive
Lupin III: Farewell to Nostradamus
Floral Magician Mary Bell
Gauche the Cellist
Hime-chan's Ribbon
Jankenman
Jarinko Chie
Lupin III: The Plot of the Fuma Clan
Kaitou Saint Tail
Kamikaze Kaitou Jeanne
Kiki's Delivery Service
Lupin III: Strange Psychokinetic Strategy
Magic Knight Rayearth (TV series)
Magical Princess Minky Momo
Creamy Mami, the Magic Angel
Persia, the Magic Fairy
Magical Emi, the Magic Star
Pastel Yumi, the Magic Idol
Magical Angel Sweet Mint
Mermaid Melody Pichi Pichi Pitch (TV series)
Mega Man: Upon a Star
Mahōjin Guru Guru
Mister Ajikko
Moomin (1969 TV series)
Mon Colle Knights
My Neighbor Totoro
Nausicaä of the Valley of the Wind
Nanamagari Sōsaichi Gakari
Neon Genesis Evangelion
New Cutie Honey
Ninja Hattori-kun
Nurse no Shigoto
Nurse Angel Ririka SOS
Noozles
Osomatsu-kun
Otoko Ippiki Gaki Daishō
Ox Tales
Pāman
Panda! Go, Panda!
Post no Naka no Asu
Powerpuff Girls Z
Pretty Cure (series)
Prince of Tennis
Princess Comet (2nd Drama and TV Series)
Ranma ½
Shōnen Ashibe
 Shimajiro (series)
Spoon Obasan
Sonic X
Super Doll Licca-chan
Super Robot Red Baron
Super Robot Mach Baron
The Genie Family
The Snow Queen
The Great Adventure of Horus, Prince of the Sun
The Wonderful Wizard of Oz
The Legend of Zorro
Tobenai Hotaru
Tonde Burin
Tokyo Mew Mew
Totsugeki! Papparatai
Ultra Series (Ultraman to Ultraman 80)
Unico
Urusei Yatsura
Warrior of Love Rainbowman
Yakyūkyō no Uta
Yu-Gi-Oh! series
Yūkai

References

External links
 Tokyo Laboratory (official site)

Mass media companies established in 1955
Mass media companies based in Tokyo
Service companies based in Tokyo
Film production companies of Japan
1955 establishments in Japan